Týr is the god of law, justice, the sky, war and heroic glory in Norse mythology.

Týr, Tyr, or TYR may also refer to:

Music 

 Týr (band), a Faroese folk metal band
 Tyr (album), a 1990 album by the heavy metal band Black Sabbath
 Jan Erik Tiwaz (born 1972), a.k.a. Tyr, a Norwegian bassist formerly with the band Borknagar
 "Tyr", a 2017 single by Danheim

Entertainment 

 Tyr (comics), several characters
 Tyr (Forgotten Realms), a deity in the Dungeons & Dragons fantasy role-playing game
 Tyr, a city state in the Dark Sun Dungeons & Dragons universe
 Tyr Anasazi, a character on the television series Andromeda
 Tyr, a character in the video game God Of War Ragnorôk

Ships 

 HNoMS Tyr (1887), a Royal Norwegian Navy minelaying vessel
 HNoMS Tyr (N50), a 1981 Royal Norwegian Navy mine control vessel
 USS Sustain (AM-119), a US Navy minesweeper acquired by Norway and renamed HNoMS Tyr (N47)
 ICGV Týr, a 1974 offshore patrol vessel and the flagship of the Icelandic Coast Guard
 Hvalur 9 RE-399, a 1952 Icelandic whaler requisitioned by the Icelandic Coast Guard and renamed Týr

Abbreviation 

 Tyr, abbreviation of tyrosine, an amino acid
 TYR, symbol for tyrosinase, a protein
 TYR, ICAO airline code of Austrian Arrows
 TYR, IATA airport code of Tyler Pounds Regional Airport, Tyler, Texas
 TYR, Chapman code for County Tyrone, Northern Ireland

Other uses 
 Tyr (journal), US traditionalist journal
 Tyr, Russia, a village
 TYR Sport, a swimwear apparel and gear manufacturing company
 Ulmus × hollandica 'Tyr', a bonsai cultivar
 4092 Tyr, an asteroid; see list of minor planets: 4001–5000
 Operation Tyr; see list of coalition military operations of the Iraq War

See also
 Tyre (disambiguation)